Lajos Tüköry (9 September 1830 – 6 June 1860) was a Hungarian military leader who fought with Garibaldi in the  Expedition of the Thousand. He was killed during the siege of Palermo.

References

1830 births
1860 deaths
Hungarian military personnel
Members of the Expedition of the Thousand